On 25 March 1971, the Pakistani military, supported by paramilitary units, launched the military operation to pacify the insurgent-held areas of East Pakistan, which led to a prolonged conflict with the Bengali Mukti Bahini. Although conventional in nature during March–May 1971, it soon turned into a guerrilla insurgency from June of that year. Indian Army had not directly supported the Bengali resistance but had launched Operation Jackpot to support the insurgency from May 1971.

The initial deployments of the Pakistan armed forces were to combat and contain the activities of the Mukti Bahini. This was changed over time and by December 1971, 3 Infantry and 2 ad hoc divisions were deployed to face the Mitro Bahini.

Background: Initial deployments against Mukti Bahini

From the March 1971, the Pakistani military's Eastern Command under its commander Lieutenant-General A.A.K. Niazi, started military deployment to provide the defence of borders linked with India against a possible penetration by the Indian Army. During this time, the 9th Infantry Division, headquartered in Jessore under its GOC Major-General Shaukat Riaz, had held the area of responsibility for looking after the looking area south of the Padma River for the defence of borders linked with India while the 16th Infantry Division, that headquartered in Bogra under its GOC Major-General Nazar Hussain Shah, had been responsible for the area north of Padma and west of Jamuna rivers.

The 14th Infantry Division under its GOC Major-General Rahim Khan, was headquartered in Dhaka that had the entire area of responsibility for the rest of the province.

The original plan was based on a series of exercises, known as Titumeer, which were held during 1970–1971, was revised several times and approved in October 1971. General Niazi had created 4 ad hoc infantry brigades and 2 ad hoc infantry divisions before the final order of battle was devised. The final order of battle prior to 3 December 1971, was:

Eastern Command Headquarters, Dhaka
Commander, Eastern Command: Lt. Gen. A.A.K. Niazi
GOC, 14th Infantry Division (till March '71): Maj. Gen. Khadim Hussain Raja
Military Advisor: Maj. Gen. Rao Farman Ali
COS: Brig. Baqir Siddiqi
CO Artillery: Brig. S.S.A. Kashim
CO Armoured: Col. Bakhtier
CO Engineers: Brig. Iqbal Sharif
CO Signals: Brig. Areef Reza
CO Medical: Brig. Fahim Ahmed Khan
CO SSG Army: Lt. Col. Tariq Mehmood
Dir. ISPR: Major Siddique Salik
Dir. Military Intelligence: Major K.M. Arif

Units under HQ Control: **6th Engineer Regiment **10th Engineer Regiment – detached to various locations **11th Engineer Regiment –  Lt. Col Sarwar ** 43rd Light Ack Ack – Lt. Col. Mohammad Afzal ** 19th Signal Regiment **3rd Commando Battalion (less elements) **Army Aviation Squadron #4 – Lt. Col. Liakat Bokhari

Dhaka Defense Scheme (adhoc)

Brig. Kashim (North): Dhaka Cantonment & Tongi area
Brig. Mian Mansoor (East): Munshiganj & Narayanganj
Brig. T.H. Malik: Hilli & Bogra
Brig. Bashir: Dhaka city proper
Brig. William Harrison: Comilla & Chittagong
EPCAF HQ and Sector units:
Police and Razakars

36 Ad hoc Infantry Division
GOC: Major General Muhammad Jamshed HQ Dhaka
Area of Operation: Dhaka, Tangail and Mymensingh districts
93 Infantry Brigade: Brig Abdul Qadir Khan HQ Mymensingh
83 Independent. Mortar battery
31 Baluch –  Jamalpur
33 Punjab – Mymensingh
71 Wing WPR – Kishorganj
70 Wing WPR – Bijaipur

14 Infantry Division
GOC: Major General Abdul Majid Qazi, HQ Brahmanbaria
Area of Operation: Sylhet and Northern Comilla districts
31st Field Artillery – Ashuganj – Brahmanbaria – Shamshernagar
88 Independent Mortar Battery – Sylhet
171 Independent Mortar Battery – Comilla

Sylhet
202 Adhoc Brigade: Brig. Salimullah
31 Punjab – Sylhet
91 Mujahid Force Battalion – Sunamganj
12 Azad Kashmir – Sylhet
Also: Wings of Tochi, Thal and Khyber scouts

Moulvibazar
313 infantry Brigade: Brig. Iftikar Rana
22 Baloch – Kulaura (Battle of Gazipur)
30 Frontier Force – Shamshernagar (in Kamalganj)
91 Mujahid Force (minus elements) & Tochi Scouts – Sherpur

Brahmanbaria
27th Infantry Brigade: Brig. Saadullah
33rd Baluch – Kasba
12th Frontier Force – Akhaura
2 Troops of M-24 Chaffee – Akhaura

39 Ad hoc Division
GOC: Maj. Gen. Rahim Khan (replaced by Brig. Mian Mansoor) – Chandpur
Area of Operation: Comilla, Feni and Northern Chittagong
53rd Field Artillery – Comilla

Comilla
117th Infantry Brigade: Brig. Sheikh M.H. Atif
30 Punjab – Saldanadi
25th Frontier Force – Mainamati
12th Azad Kashmir – Comilla

Feni
53rde Infantry Brigade: Brig. Aslam Niazi
15th Baluch – Belonia
39th Baluch – Laksham
23rd Punjab – Mean Bazar
21 Azad Kashmir – Laksham

Ramgarh
91st Ad hoc Brigade: Brig. Mian Taskeenuddin HQ Chittagong
24th Frontier Force – Ramgarh
Chakma and Mizo troops
EPCAF 11th and 14th Wings

Chittagong
97th Independent Brigade: Brig. Ata Mohd. Khan Malik
48th Baluch – Chittagong
2 SSg Commando – Rangamati
60th Wing Rangers – Ramgarh
61st Wing Rangers – Cox's Bazar
 Naval Contingent
46th Light Ack Ack Battery

16th Infantry Division
GOC: Maj. Gen. Nazar Hussain Shah HQ: Bogra, then Natore
Area of Operation: Rajshahi, Bogra, Dinajpur, Rangpur and Pabna Districts

29th Cavalry less elements –Rangpur
30 SIGNALS BATTALION - Rangpur
13 Engineer Battalion - Various Locations
48th Field Regiment – Thakurgaon
80th Field Regiment – Hili
117th Mortar Battery – Kurigram

Saidpur
23rd Infantry Brigade: Brig. Iqbal Shaffi
25th Punjab – Lalmanirhut
26th Frontier Force – Dinajpur
48th Punjab – Thakurgaon
8 Punjab – Rangpur
34th Punjab – Nilphamari
86th Mujahid – Gaibandha

Bogra
205th Infantry Brigade: Brig. Tajammul Hussain Malik HQ: Khetlal
32nd Baluch – Ghoraghat
4th Frontier Force – Hili
3rd Baluch – Jaipurhut

Nator
34th Infantry Brigade: Brig. Mir Abdul Nayeem
32nd Punjab – Nawabganj
13th Frontier Force – Sapahar

Rajshahi
Rajshahi Ad hoc Brigade

9th Infantry Division
GOC: Maj. Gen HM. H. Ansari HQ Jessore
Area of Operation: Khulna, Jessore, Kushtia, Faridpur, Barisal and Patuakhali districts
3rd Ind. Armored Squadron – Jessore
55th Field Artillery – Satkhira and Chaugacha
49th Field Artillery – Chuadanga
211th Independent Mortar Battery – Chaugacha

Jhenidha
57th Infantry Brigade: Brig. Manzoor Ahmed
18th Punjab – Darshana
50th Punjab – Jhenida
29th Baluch – Kushtia
Squadron 29th Cavalry – Kushtia

Jessore
107th Infantry Brigade: Brig. Malik Hayat Khan
22nd Frontier Force – Benapole
38th Frontier Force – Afra
6th Punjab – Jessore
21st Punjab – Satkhira
15th Frontier Force – Jessore
12th Punjab – Jessore

Khulna
314th Ad Hoc Brigade: Col. Fazle Hamid

Pakistan Air Force
Air Officer Commanding, Dacca airbase: Air Cdre Inamul Haque Khan 
Officer Commanding (Operations Wing): GP.Capt. Zulfiqar Ali Khan 
Officer-in Charge (OIC), No. 14 Squadron "Tail-choppers’’: Wg. Cdr. Mohammed Afzal Chowdhury
Number of aircraft of the squadron: 20 F-86 Sabers
Training unit: 3 T-33

Pakistan Navy
Flag Officer Commanding, Eastern Naval Command: R.Adm Mohammad Shariff 
CO Pakistan Marines/CO SSG Navy: Capt. Ahmad Zamir 
Dir. MILCOM: Cdr. T.K. Khan 
Dir. Nav Intel.: Cdr. Mansurul Haq
4 Gunboats: PNS Rajshahi, Comilla, Sylhet and Jessore
1 Patrol Boat: PNS Balaghat
17 armed boats

See also
 Mitro Bahini order of battle
 Evolution of Pakistan Eastern Command plan
 Military plans of the Bangladesh Liberation War
 Timeline of the Bangladesh Liberation War
 Indo-Pakistani wars and conflicts

Notes and references

Notes

References
 
  
 
 

Indo-Pakistani War of 1971
Battles of the Bangladesh Liberation War
Orders of battle
Bangladesh Liberation War